Klára Killermann (also known as Killermann-Bartos) (born 23 June 1929 in Tatabánya, died 16 July 2012) was a breaststroke swimmer from Hungary. She first won a national championship in 1942, as a 13-year-old, to the big surprise of the Hungarian swimming sport, which at that time was world-famous. In 1951 she won gold medal in 100 and 200m breast stroke at the University Games in Berlin. At the Helsinki Olympics, in 1952, she had exactly the same time as the third placed Helen Gordon 2.57,6, but according to the judges, she was placed fourth, and did not win the bronze medal. At the European Championships in 1954 she won bronze in 200m breaststroke.

Her husband was a national rowing champion, and she has two daughters, Dorottya Klára and Csilla. Her granddaughter Viktória married Prince Jaime, Count of Bardi, the son of Princess Irene of the Netherlands, herself a sister of the former Queen Beatrix. Jaime and Viktória's oldest daughter, Princess Zita Clara, is named in her memory.

References

1929 births
Hungarian female swimmers
Olympic swimmers of Hungary
Hungarian female breaststroke swimmers
Swimmers at the 1952 Summer Olympics
Swimmers at the 1956 Summer Olympics
Swimmers at the 1960 Summer Olympics
People from Tatabánya
European Aquatics Championships medalists in swimming
2012 deaths
Sportspeople from Komárom-Esztergom County
Klara